Kevin Bradshaw (30 April 1957 – 16 March 2021) was an Australian cyclist. He competed in the individual road race and team time trial events at the 1980 Summer Olympics.

References

External links

1957 births
2021 deaths
Australian male cyclists
Olympic cyclists of Australia
Cyclists at the 1980 Summer Olympics
Place of birth missing